John Alderton (born 27 November 1940) is an English actor. He is best known for his roles in Upstairs, Downstairs, Thomas & Sarah, Wodehouse Playhouse, Little Miss (original television series), Please Sir!, No, Honestly and Fireman Sam (the original series). Alderton has often starred alongside his wife, Pauline Collins.

Early life
Alderton was born on 27 November 1940 in Gainsborough, Lincolnshire, the son of Ivy (née Handley) and Gordon John Alderton. He grew up in Hull where he attended Kingston High School.

Career
He graduated from the Royal Academy of Dramatic Art in 1961 and appeared in their production of The Doctor and The Devils by Dylan Thomas. Alderton first became familiar to television viewers in 1962, when he played Dr Moone in the ITV soap opera, Emergency – Ward 10. After an uncredited role in Cleopatra (1963), and appearing in British films such as The System (1964), Assignment K (1968), Duffy (1968) and Hannibal Brooks (1969), he played the lead in the comedy series Please Sir!, as hapless teacher Mr Hedges, which later resulted in him also playing the character in the 1971 feature film of the same name.  He was cast by Richard Lester in the title role of a film version of Flashman but the project was abandoned.

In 1972, he appeared with Hannah Gordon in the BBC comedy series My Wife Next Door which ran for 13 episodes, and for which he won a Jacob's Award in 1975. He then transferred to another top-rated ITV series when he played Thomas Watkins, the chauffeur, in Upstairs, Downstairs, opposite his wife, Pauline Collins. They had a daughter (the actress Kate Alderton) and two sons and also acted together in spin-off series, Thomas & Sarah, and another sitcom, No, Honestly, as well as in Wodehouse Playhouse (1975–78), a series that featured adaptations of short stories by P. G. Wodehouse (primarily the Mr. Mulliner stories.) In the meantime, he appeared on the big screen against-type as 'Friend' in John Boorman's cult sci-fi film Zardoz (1974), before returning to more familiar territory, as 1930s Yorkshire vet James Herriot in the 1976 film, It Shouldn't Happen to a Vet. He was a subject of the television programme This Is Your Life in 1974 when he was surprised by Eamonn Andrews.

He made his first stage appearance with the repertory company of the Theatre Royal, York in August 1961, in Badger's Green by R.C. Sherriff. After a period in repertory, he made his first London appearance at the Mermaid, November 1965, as Harold Crompton in Spring and Port Wine, later transferring with the production to the Apollo. At the Aldwych. In March 1969, he played Eric Hoyden in the RSC's production of Dutch Uncle. At the Comedy Theatre, July 1969, he played Jimmy Cooper in The Night I Chased the Women with an Eel. At the Howff, October 1973, he played Stanley in Punch and Judy Stories, and played the same part in Judies at the Comedy, January 1974. At the Shaw, January 1975, he played Stanley in Pinter's The Birthday Party. At the Apollo, May 1976, he played four parts in Ayckbourn's Confusions.

During the 1980s and 1990s, Alderton had few roles. He narrated BBC1's children's original animated series Little Miss in 1983 (with his wife Pauline Collins) and, from 1987 to 1994, narrated and voiced all the characters in the original series of Fireman Sam. From 1987 to 1988 he played Estragon in Samuel Beckett's Waiting For Godot at the National Theatre. In 1988, he starred as Surgeon Robert Sandy in Tales of the Unexpected, in the episode The Surgeon, and from 1989 to 1992 he starred in the series Forever Green as the character Jack Boult. he also appeared in the film Clockwork Mice in 1995. Alderton played opposite his wife Pauline in Mrs Caldicot's Cabbage War in 2002 and made something of a comeback in the 2003 film, Calendar Girls. Then, in 2004 he played a role in the BBC series of Anthony Trollope's He Knew He Was Right. Also in 2004, Alderton starred in the first series of ITV 1's Doc Martin in an episode entitled "Of All The Harbours in All The Towns" as sailor John Slater, a friend and former lover of Aunt Joan. He played Christopher Casby in the 2008 BBC adaptation of Charles Dickens' Little Dorrit.

Personal life
Alderton married actress Jill Browne in 1964, but they divorced. In 1969, he married actress Pauline Collins and they have three children, a daughter (Kate, who is also an actress.) and two sons.

Filmography

Film

Television

References

External links

John Alderton (Aveleyman)

1940 births
20th-century English male actors
21st-century English male actors
Alumni of RADA
English male film actors
English male television actors
English male voice actors
Jacob's Award winners
Living people
People from Gainsborough, Lincolnshire